Sensaciones is the first album by Mexican iconic pop singer Verónica Castro. It was released in 1978, selling more than 1,000,000 Units. «Mi Pequeño Ciclon» is a song for her son Cristian Castro.

Track listing
  "Yo Quisiera Señor Locutor" (Fabiola Del Carmen)
  "Cual Es Tu Nombre, Cuál Es Tu Numero" (Bobby Woods, Roger Cook)
  "Mi Corazón No Es Un Juguete" (Luis Cenobio Gobes)
  "No Soy Monedita De Oro"  (Cuco Sanchez)
  "Pequeño Ciclón"  (Manolo Marroqui)
  "Soy Celosa"  (Fabiola Del Carmen)
  "Amigo"
  "Sentimiento Festivo"
  "Te Amo, Me Amas"
  "Adiós"  (Juan Gabriel)

Sencillos

Album

1978 albums
Verónica Castro albums